Naheed Begum is a Pakistani politician who had been a Member of the Provincial Assembly of Sindh, from 2008 to May 2018.

Early life and education
She was born on 15 November 1975 in Sukkur. According to another report, she was born on 15 December 1975.

She earned the degree of the Bachelor of Education, Bachelor of Science and Master of Arts, all from Shah Abdul Latif University.

Political career
She was elected to the Provincial Assembly of Sindh as a candidate of Muttahida Qaumi Movement (MQM) on a reserved seat for women in 2008 Pakistani general election.

She was re-elected to the Provincial Assembly of Sindh as a candidate of MQM on a reserved seat for women in 2013 Pakistani general election.

In March 2018, she quit MQM and joined Pak Sarzameen Party (PSP).

References

Living people
Sindh MPAs 2013–2018
1975 births
Muttahida Qaumi Movement politicians
Sindh MPAs 2008–2013